Giannis Vonortas (born 25 June 1960) is a Greek professional football manager and former player.

Playing career
Vonortas played at Panathinaikos, Egaleo, Levadiakos, and Panargiakos.

Coaching career
Vonortas became assistant manager of Panathinaikos F.C. in 2005. When Fabri was sacked as manager of Panathinaikos on 31 March 2013, Vonortas was installed as caretaker manager until the end of the season

References

External links
 

1960 births
Living people
Greek footballers
Footballers from Athens
Association football defenders
Super League Greece players
Egaleo F.C. players
Panathinaikos F.C. players
Levadiakos F.C. players
Greek football managers
Panathinaikos F.C. managers
Panathinaikos F.C. non-playing staff